The name Khafre can refer to:

 The Pharaoh Khafre, also known as Khafre or Chephren
 Khafre (cipher), a block cipher